This is a list of defunct airlines of Poland.

See also
 List of airlines of Poland
 List of airports in Poland

References

Poland
Airlines
Airlines, defunct